Roshnik is a commune in Berat County, central Albania. At the 2015 local government reform it became a subdivision of the municipality Berat. The population at the 2011 census was 2,513. The Köprülü family of Ottoman viziers came from this municipality.

Geography 
Roshnik is located in northern Berat County and is part of Berat municipality. It borders the commune of Vërtop to the south, Zhepë to the east, Berat and Otllak to the west, and Lumas to the north. Roshnik is approximately 9km (5.5mi) from the main city of Berat.

It is subdivided into the following villages: Bogdan i Poshtëm, Bogdan i Sipërm, Dardhë, Karkanjoz, Kostren i Madh, Kostren i Vogël, Mimias, Perisnak, Qafë Dardhë, Roshnik Qendër, Roshnik i Vogël, Vojnik, Rabjak.

Demographics 

535 residents, 21% of the total population, were under the age of 14. There were 288 people who were older than 65, accounting for 11% of the population. The gender ratio is roughly even, with 1,259 females and 1,254 males.

Notable person 
 Köprülü Mehmed Pasha

References 

Former municipalities in Berat County
Administrative units of Berat
Populated places disestablished in 2015